The 1938 BYU Cougars football team was an American football team that represented Brigham Young University (BYU) as a member of the Mountain States Conference (MSC) during the 1938 college football season. In their second season under head coach Eddie Kimball, the Cougars compiled an overall record of 4–3–1 with a mark of 3–2–1 against conference opponents, finished second in the MSC, and outscored opponents by a total of 93 to 49.

Schedule

References

BYU
BYU Cougars football seasons
BYU Cougars football